Yianni may refer to:

 Yianni Papoutsis, Greek-English entrepreneur
 Yianni Perkatis, Australian footballer
 Yianni "Johnny" Bacolas, American musician and artist

See also 
 Yiannis
 Yanni (disambiguation)